You Hwai-yin (born 26 April 1942) is a Taiwanese banker and politician. He served in the Legislative Yuan from 1993 to 2002.

You studied at Chinese Culture University and attended graduate school at the University of San Francisco.

While You was a legislator, he chaired the Wan Gwo Securities Investment Trust Company and the Fu Long Securities Company and was also the largest shareholder in Taitung Business Bank. As part of an investigation into black gold politics, You was indicted for insider trading in August 2000. In September, the Taipei District Court found that You had concealed the Taitung Business Bank's 1996 losses in an effort to raise more capital. He was sentenced to a prison term of three months. Subsequent legal action in 2012 approximated the total loss at NT$2.6 billion and You was sentenced to another six years and six months in prison by the Taitung District Court.

References

1942 births
Living people
Taiwanese bankers
Changhua County Members of the Legislative Yuan
Kuomintang Members of the Legislative Yuan in Taiwan
Members of the 2nd Legislative Yuan
Members of the 3rd Legislative Yuan
Members of the 4th Legislative Yuan
Party List Members of the Legislative Yuan
Taiwanese politicians convicted of insider trading
Chinese Culture University alumni
University of San Francisco alumni